Galaxy X may refer to:

Galaxy Nexus, a smartphone released in 2011, marketed in Brazil as the "Galaxy X"
Galaxy X (galaxy), a postulated satellite galaxy of the Milky Way Galaxy
"Galaxy X" (trilogy), a 2009 trilogy of The Hardy Boys novels, see List of Hardy Boys books
Galaxy X (novel), a 2009 novel in the eponymous trilogy of "The Hardy Boys" novels, see List of Hardy Boys books

See also
 X-shaped radio galaxy
 X-ray galaxy
 Galaxy Note 10.1
 Galaxy Tab 10.1
 Galaxy 10, a satellite lost on launch in 1998; see Delta III#Launches
 Galaxy 10R